Sorensenata is a genus of moths belonging to the subfamily Tortricinae of the family Tortricidae. It contains only one species, Sorensenata agilitata, Sorenson's agile moth, which is found in New Zealand, where it has been recorded from Campbell Island.

The wingspan of the males is 18 mm. Females are flightless. The forewings of the males are ochreous to creamy-white with a shading of light brown scales. The hindwings are white. Adults have been recorded in September and October.

The larvae possibly feed on Poa litorosa.

Further reading
 , 2005: World catalogue of insects Volume 5 Tortricidae.

References

Archipini
Monotypic moth genera
Moths of New Zealand
Moths described in 1956
Tortricidae genera